Bailey Peninsula is a rocky peninsula, about  long and  wide, on the Budd Coast of Wilkes Land in Antarctica.  It is the site of Australia’s Casey Station.

Antarctic Specially Protected Area
An area of land on the peninsula, lying only some 200 m east of Casey Station, is protected under the Antarctic Treaty System as North-east Bailey Peninsula Antarctic Specially Protected Area (ASPA) No.135 primarily because it serves as a scientific reference site which has supported studies into the diverse range of vegetation found in the Windmill Islands region. 

The Casey Station reported the first heatwave at the site in 2020, with temperatures reaching 9.2 degrees Celsius in January.

See also
Holt Point

References

Peninsulas of Antarctica
Landforms of Wilkes Land
Antarctic Specially Protected Areas